Swayne School may refer to:

Swayne School, predecessor of Talladega College
Swayne School that served students from Owyhee, Nevada
Swayne College, predecessor of Booker T. Washington High School in Montgomery, Alabama